The following outline is provided as an overview of and topical guide to Alberta:

Alberta – province of Canada. It had a population of 3,645,257 in 2011, making it the most populous of Canada's three prairie provinces. Alberta and its neighbour, Saskatchewan, were established as provinces on September 1, 1905. Alberta is located in western Canada, bounded by the provinces of British Columbia to the west and Saskatchewan to the east, the Northwest Territories to the north, and the U.S. state of Montana to the south. Alberta is one of three Canadian provinces and territories to border only a single U.S. state and is also one of only two provinces that are landlocked.

General reference 
 Pronunciation: 
 Common English name(s): Alberta
 Official English name: Alberta
 Abbreviations and name codes
 Postal symbol: "T"
 ISO 3166-2 code:  CA-AB
 Internet second-level domain:  .ab.ca
 Common endonym(s):   
 Official endonym(s):  
 Adjectival(s): Alberta
 Demonym(s): Albertan

Geography of Alberta 

Geography of Alberta
 Alberta is: a landlocked province of Canada
 Location:
 The regions in which Alberta is located are:
 Northern Hemisphere, Western Hemisphere
 Americas
 North America
 Northern America
 Canada
 Western Canada
 Canadian Prairies
 Extreme points of Alberta
 Population of Alberta: 4,067,175 (2016)
 Area of Alberta: 
 Atlas of Alberta

Environment of Alberta 
 Protected areas of Alberta
 Provincial historic sites of Alberta
 Wildlife of Alberta
 Birds of Alberta

Natural geographic features of Alberta 
 Glaciers of Alberta
 Lakes of Alberta
 Mountains of Alberta
 Mountain ranges of Alberta
 Mountain passes of Alberta
 Peaks on the Alberta–British Columbia border
 Rivers of Alberta
 Waterfalls of Alberta
 Valleys of Alberta
 coulees in Alberta
 Hot springs of Alberta
 World Heritage Sites in Alberta
 Canadian Rocky Mountain Parks World Heritage Site
 Dinosaur Provincial Park
 Head-Smashed-In Buffalo Jump
 Waterton-Glacier International Peace Park
 Wood Buffalo National Park

Regions of Alberta 

 Northern Alberta
 Peace River Country
 Alberta's Rockies
 Southern Alberta
 Cypress Hills
 Palliser's Triangle
 Calgary Region
 Calgary–Edmonton Corridor
 Edmonton Capital Region
 Calgary–Edmonton Corridor
 Central Alberta
 Calgary–Edmonton Corridor

Administrative divisions of Alberta 
 Health regions of Alberta
 School authorities in Alberta

Census statistical divisions of Alberta 
 Census agglomerations in Alberta
 Census divisions of Alberta
 Designated places in Alberta
 Population centres in Alberta

Communities of Alberta 
 Communities in Alberta
 Municipalities (incorporated communities) in Alberta
 Cities in Alberta
 Calgary
 Edmonton
 Improvement districts in Alberta
 Métis settlements in Alberta
 Municipal districts in Alberta
 Special areas in Alberta
 Specialized municipalities in Alberta
 Summer villages in Alberta
 Towns in Alberta
 Villages in Alberta
 Unincorporated communities in Alberta
 Hamlets in Alberta
 Settlements in Alberta
 Unincorporated communities in Alberta
 Indian reserves in Alberta

Demographics of Alberta 

Demographics of Alberta
 Demographics of Calgary
 Demographics of Edmonton

Government and politics of Alberta 

Politics of Alberta

 Battle of Alberta – political and competitive rivalry between Edmonton and Calgary
 Capital of Alberta: Edmonton
 Form of government: Constitutional monarchy
 Elections in Alberta
 First Nations in Alberta – First Nations are the various Aboriginal peoples in Canada who are neither Inuit nor Métis
 Indian Association of Alberta – province-wide First Nations rights organization
 Political parties in Alberta
 Political scandals of Alberta
 Taxation in Canada

Federal representation 
 Senators

Provincial government of Alberta

Executive branch

 Head of state: King in Right of Alberta, King of Canada, King Charles III
 Head of state's representative (Viceroy): Lieutenant Governor of Alberta
 List of lieutenant governors of Alberta
 Head of government: Premier of Alberta
 List of premiers of Alberta
 List of premiers of Alberta by time in office
 Cabinet: Executive Council of Alberta
 Head of council: Lieutenant Governor in Council, as representative of the King in Right of Alberta
 List of Alberta provincial ministers
 Order of precedence in Alberta
 Alberta ministries
 Alberta International and Intergovernmental Relations

Legislative branch

 Government of Alberta, which has 2 components:
 King-in-Parliament (King of Canada), represented in his absence by the Lieutenant-Governor of Alberta
 List of lieutenant governors of Alberta
 Legislative Assembly of Alberta
 Speaker of the Legislative Assembly of Alberta
 List of Alberta Legislative Assemblies
 Federal representation
 List of Alberta senators

Judicial branch

 Court of Appeal of Alberta
 Court of King's Bench of Alberta (Superior court)
 Provincial Court of Alberta

Law and order in Alberta 

 Adult interdependent relationship in Alberta
 Same-sex marriage in Alberta
 Capital punishment in Alberta: none.
 Alberta, as with all of Canada, does not have capital punishment.
 Canada eliminated the death penalty for murder on July 14, 1976.
 Constitution of Alberta
 Criminal justice system of Alberta
 Criminal Code of Canada

Law enforcement in Alberta 

 Alberta Provincial Police (defunct)

Military in Alberta 
 Canadian Forces bases in Alberta
 Military in Alberta
 Military in Calgary

Local government in Alberta 
 Municipal elections in Alberta
 Municipalities in Alberta
 Urban municipalities in Alberta
 Cities in Alberta
 Towns in Alberta
 Villages in Alberta
 Summer villages in Alberta
 Specialized municipalities in Alberta
 Rural municipalities in Alberta
 Municipal districts in Alberta
 Special areas in Alberta
 Improvement districts in Alberta
 Métis settlements in Alberta

History of Alberta 

History of Alberta

 Timeline of Alberta History

 Bibliography of Alberta history

History of Alberta, by period 
 District of Alberta

History of Alberta, by region 

 History of Edmonton
Timeline of Edmonton history
 Timeline of Calgary history
 History of Red Deer, Alberta

History of Alberta, by subject 

 Ghost towns in Alberta

Culture of Alberta 
 Architecture of Alberta
 Cuisine of Alberta
 Canadian Chinese cuisine
 Festivals in Alberta
 Gambling in Alberta
 Casinos and horse racing tracks in Alberta
 Historic places in Alberta
 World Heritage Sites in Alberta
 National Historic Sites of Canada in Alberta
 Provincial historic sites of Alberta
 Languages of Alberta
 Museums of Alberta
 People of Alberta
 Indigenous peoples of Alberta
 First Nations in Alberta
 Métis in Alberta
 Métis Nation of Alberta
 Symbols of Alberta
 Coat of arms of Alberta
 Flag of Alberta
 Scouting and Guiding in Alberta

The arts in Alberta 
 Music of Alberta

Sports in Alberta 

 Battle of Alberta – sports and competitive rivalry between Edmonton and Calgary
 Cycling in Alberta
 Tour of Alberta
 Curling in Alberta
 Curling clubs in Alberta
 Golf in Alberta
 Golf courses in Alberta
 Ice hockey in Alberta
 Ice hockey teams in Alberta
 Junior hockey
 Alberta Junior Hockey League
 Calgary Junior Hockey League
 Calgary Junior C Hockey League
 Capital Junior Hockey League
 Heritage Junior B Hockey League
 North Eastern Alberta Junior B Hockey League
 Noralta Junior Hockey League
 North West Junior Hockey League
 Minor hockey
 Alberta Midget Hockey League
 Soccer in Alberta
 Alberta Soccer Association
 Alberta Major Soccer League

Economy and infrastructure of Alberta 

 Economic rank (by nominal GDP):
 Banking in Alberta
 Banks and credit unions in Canada
 Bank of Alberta
 Communications in Alberta
 List of Alberta area codes
 Media in Alberta
 Newspapers in Alberta
 Radio stations in Alberta
 Television stations in Alberta
 Currency of Alberta:
 Energy in Alberta
 Electricity policy of Alberta
 Electrical generating stations in Alberta
 Health care in Alberta
 Hospitals in Alberta
 Alberta Medical Association
 Mining in Alberta
 Mines in Alberta
 Tourism in Alberta
 Transportation in Alberta
 Air transport in Alberta
 Airlines of Alberta
 Airports in Alberta
 Roads in Alberta
 Provincial highways of Alberta
 Vehicle registration plates of Alberta

Education in Alberta 
 Public education in Alberta
 List of school authorities in Alberta
  List of high schools in Alberta
 Higher education in Alberta
 Students' associations in Alberta
 Colleges in Alberta
 University of Alberta
 Council of Alberta University Students
 Presidents of the University of Alberta
 Chancellors of the University of Alberta
 Faculties and departments of the University of Alberta
 University of Alberta Augustana Faculty
 University of Alberta Faculté Saint-Jean
 University of Alberta Faculty of Arts
 University of Alberta Faculty of Engineering
 University of Alberta Faculty of Extension
 University of Alberta Faculty of Law
 University of Alberta Faculty of Medicine and Dentistry
 University of Alberta Faculty of Pharmacy and Pharmaceutical Sciences
 List of University of Alberta people
 List of University of Alberta honorary degree recipients
 University of Alberta Hospital
 University of Alberta Press
 University of Alberta Protective Services
 University of Alberta School of Business
 University of Alberta Students' Union
 College & Association of Registered Nurses of Alberta
 College and Association of Respiratory Therapists of Alberta
 College of Physicians and Surgeons of Alberta
 Concordia University College of Alberta

See also 

 
 
 
 
 Index of Alberta-related articles
 List of international rankings
 Outline of geography
 Outline of Canada
 Outline of British Columbia
 Outline of Manitoba
 Outline of Nova Scotia
 Outline of Ontario
 Outline of Prince Edward Island
 Outline of Quebec
 Outline of Saskatchewan
 Provincial Archives of Alberta
 Sexual Sterilization Act of Alberta
 TUXIS Parliament of Alberta

References

External links 

 Government of Alberta website
 
 Provincial Archives of Alberta website
 Travel Alberta
 Alberta Encyclopedia
 CBC Digital Archives—Striking Oil in Alberta
 CBC Digital Archives—Electing Dynasties: Alberta Campaigns 1935 to 2001
 CBC Digital Archives—Alberta @ 100

Alberta
Alberta